"Change Your Mind" is a single by R&B/funk band Earth, Wind & Fire issued in 2006 by Kalimba Music. The song reached No. 26 on the Billboard Adult R&B Songs chart.

Overview
"Change Your Mind" was produced by Maurice White and written by White, Bill Meyers and Brenda Russell. The song was included on EWF's studio album ''In The Name of Love.

References

Earth, Wind & Fire songs
2006 songs
Songs written by Brenda Russell
Songs written by Maurice White